Felipe Ferreira da Cruz (born 23 April 2000), commonly known as Felipe, is a Brazililian footballer who plays as a forward for Ferroviário.

Career statistics

Club

Notes

References

2000 births
Living people
Brazilian footballers
Association football forwards
Sampaio Corrêa Futebol Clube players
Ferroviário Atlético Clube (CE) players
Oeste Futebol Clube players
Campeonato Brasileiro Série B players